Thinae (Greek: Θῖναι, or Σῖναι), or Thina (Θῖνα), was a capital city of the Sinae (modern China), who carried on there a large commerce in silk and woollen stuffs.

History 
There appears to have been an ancient tradition that the city was surrounded with brazen walls; but Ptolemy remarks that these did not exist there, nor anything else worthy of remark. The ancient writers differ very considerably as to its situation. According to the most probable accounts it was either Nankin, or rather perhaps Thsin, Tin, or Tein, in the province of Schensi, where, according to the accounts of the Chinese themselves, the first kingdom of Sin, or China, was founded.

See also 

 Sino-Roman relations
 Names of China
 Silk Road
 Tenduc
 Luoyang

References

Sources 

 Dyer, Thomas H. (1857). "Thinae". In Smith, William (ed.). Dictionary of Greek and Roman Geography. Vol. 2: Iabadius–Zymethus. London: Walton and Maberly. p. 1174. 
 Karttunen, Klaus (2006). "Sinae". In Salazar, Christine F. (ed.). Brill's New Pauly. Brill Publishers. Retrieved 16 May 2022.
 Ritter, Carl (1833). Die Erdkunde im Verhältniß zur Natur und zur Geschichte des Menschen, oder allgemeine vergleichende Geographie, als sichere Grundlage des Studiums und Unterrichts in physicalischen und historischen Wissenschaften. Band 2: Der Nord-Osten und der Süden von Hoch-Asien. Berlin: G. Reimer. p. 199. [Boston: De Gruyter, 2018].
 Schoff, Wilfred H. (1912). The Periplus of the Erythraean Sea: Travel and Trade in the Indian Ocean by a Merchant of the First Century. London, Bombay and Calcutta: Longmans, Green, and Co. p. 48.

Greco-Roman ethnography
Ancient cities